John Francis O'Donovan (10 April 1918 – 5 November 1999), was an Irish chess player.

Biography
At the end of 1930s, John Francis O'Donovan was one of the strongest Irish chess players. He participated mainly in local chess tournaments.

John Francis O'Donovan played for Ireland in the Chess Olympiad:
 In 1939, at second board in the 8th Chess Olympiad in Buenos Aires (+7, =4, -5).

He remained in Argentina after the end of the Chess Olympiad due to the outbreak of World War II.

References

External links

John Francis O’Donovan chess games at 365chess.com

1918 births
1999 deaths
People from Cobh
Irish chess players
Chess Olympiad competitors
20th-century chess players
Irish emigrants to Argentina